Meledje Djedjan Omnibes (born 25 September 1997), known as Yaya Meledje, is an Ivorian professional footballer who plays as a midfielder.

Career

Septemvri Sofia 
In January 2016, Meledje joined Bulgarian Third League club Septemvri Sofia.

Botev Plovdiv 
In July 2016, after a successful trial period, Meledje signed a one-year contract with Bulgarian First League side Botev Plovdiv. He made his debut for Botev in a match against Ludogorets Razgrad on 6 August 2016. On 17 November 2016, Meledje signed an extension to his contract, which would have kept him with the club until 2018. On 24 May 2017, he played for Botev in the Bulgarian Cup Final, helping his team to win the Bulgarian Cup for first time in 36 years. 

Meledje marked a good start of the season 2017–18, being chosen for the best eleven for the second round in First League. In the beginning of September Meledje was close to transfer in the Israeli Premier League, but the transfer failed after the transfer window was closed before any agreement.

Return to Septemvri
On 21 January 2018, after a few days of speculations, Meledje returned to his previous Bulgarian team Septemvri Sofia, which also owned 40% of his rights. He completed his re-debut for the team on 17 February 2018 in the first league match for the year, against Etar Veliko Tarnovo.

Hapoel Hadera
On the 21st of July 2020, he signed for the Israeli Premier League club Hapoel Hadera.

Career statistics

Club

Honours
Botev Plovdiv
Bulgarian Cup: 2016–17
Bulgarian Supercup: 2017

References

External links
 

Living people
1997 births
Ivorian footballers
Association football midfielders
Aspire Academy (Senegal) players
FC Septemvri Sofia players
Botev Plovdiv players
PFC Beroe Stara Zagora players
Hapoel Hadera F.C. players
Hapoel Petah Tikva F.C. players
MC Oujda players
First Professional Football League (Bulgaria) players
Israeli Premier League players
Liga Leumit players
Botola players
Expatriate footballers in Bulgaria
Expatriate footballers in Israel
Expatriate footballers in Morocco
Ivorian expatriate sportspeople in Bulgaria
Ivorian expatriate sportspeople in Israel
Ivorian expatriate sportspeople in Morocco
People from San-Pédro, Ivory Coast